Sergei Nikolayevich Yuran (Serhij Mykolajovyč Juran; born 11 June 1969) is a Russian professional football manager and a former player.

As a striker, he represented the USSR and Russia at international level. He has Russian, Ukrainian and Portuguese citizenship.

Club career
At club level he played in six countries. After his playing career abruptly ended in 2001 following a skull injury, he became a manager.

International career
He was capped by the USSR (and later the CIS), and despite being born in Ukraine and having been honored as the best Ukrainian footballer, chose to represent Russia after the breakup of the USSR. He was part of the CIS squad at the UEFA Euro 1992, appearing in two matches, and part of the Russia squad at the 1994 FIFA World Cup, making one appearance.

In 2009, he was part of the Russia squad that won the 2009 Legends Cup, a friendly tournament for retired players.

Coaching career
His first experience in coaching was as assistant manager under Andrey Chernyshov in Spartak Moscow, 2003. After three months, Chernyshov and his assistants were fired from Spartak. In 2004 Yuran managed Dynamo Stavropol. After a brief spell with Latvian side FC Ditton from January to May 2006, Yuran was appointed as manager of Estonian champions FC TVMK in July 2006, but in December he unexpectedly left the team. Soon, he took charge at the First Division side Shinnik Yaroslavl, aiming to win promotion to the Premier League.
Since summer of 2008 Sergey Yuran was head coach of FC Khimki, he was fired on 2 December 2008, despite the fact that the club managed to stay in the Russian Premier League.
On 29 December 2014, he became manager of Russian Football National League club FC Baltika Kaliningrad.

On 27 January 2020, he was hired once again by Khimki, now in the Russian Football National League. The club only played 2 games after the resumption of the 2019–20 season after the winter break and then the season was abandoned due to the COVID-19 pandemic in Russia. As Khimki were 2nd in the league at the time of abandonment, the club was promoted to the Russian Premier League. He led Khimki to the 2019–20 Russian Cup final, where the club lost to FC Zenit Saint Petersburg. On 1 August 2020, he was fired by Khimki.

On 21 October 2020, he was hired by FNL club SKA-Khabarovsk.

On 23 February 2022, Yuran was hired by Khimki for his third spell at the club, with the team in last place in the Russian Premier League standings at the time. Under his management, Khimki avoided relegation through the playoffs. After just 4 games in the 2022–23 season, with the club in 7th place, Yuran left Khimki by mutual consent.

Personal life
His son Artyom Yuran is a professional footballer.

Career statistics

Player

Honours

Club
Dynamo Kyiv
Soviet Top League: 1990
USSR Cup: 1990

Benfica
Primeira Divisão: 1993–94
Taça de Portugal: 1992–93

Porto
Primeira Divisão: 1994–95

Spartak Moscow
Russian Premier League: 1999

Individual
 Ukrainian Footballer of the Year: 1990
 European Cup Top Scorer: 1992 (shared with Jean-Pierre Papin)

References

External links
 International record at RSSSF.com
 Yuran abroad, all goals at Legioner.Kulichki.com
 Player profile at Permian.ru 
 
 

1969 births
Living people
Ukrainian emigrants to Russia
Footballers from Luhansk
Soviet footballers
Soviet Union under-21 international footballers
Soviet Union international footballers
Russian footballers
Russia international footballers
Russian expatriate footballers
Expatriate footballers in England
Russian expatriate sportspeople in England
Expatriate footballers in Germany
Russian expatriate sportspeople in Germany
Expatriate footballers in Austria
Russian expatriate sportspeople in Austria
Russian football managers
Dual internationalists (football)
Association football forwards
FC Zorya Luhansk players
FC Dynamo Kyiv players
S.L. Benfica footballers
FC Porto players
Millwall F.C. players
FC Spartak Moscow players
Fortuna Düsseldorf players
VfL Bochum players
SK Sturm Graz players
Soviet Top League players
Soviet First League players
Bundesliga players
Primeira Liga players
Russian Premier League players
Austrian Football Bundesliga players
UEFA Euro 1992 players
1994 FIFA World Cup players
UEFA Champions League top scorers
Russian expatriate football managers
Expatriate football managers in Latvia
Russian expatriate sportspeople in Latvia
FC TVMK managers
Expatriate football managers in Estonia
Russian expatriate sportspeople in Estonia
FC Dynamo Stavropol managers
FC Shinnik Yaroslavl managers
FC Khimki managers
Expatriate football managers in Kazakhstan
Russian expatriate sportspeople in Kazakhstan
FC Astana managers
Russian Premier League managers
FC Sibir Novosibirsk managers
Expatriate football managers in Azerbaijan
Russian expatriate sportspeople in Azerbaijan
FC Baltika Kaliningrad managers
Expatriate football managers in Armenia
Russian expatriate sportspeople in Armenia
FC Mika managers
FC SKA-Khabarovsk managers
Naturalised citizens of Portugal